The Little Comrade is a 2018 Estonian film directed by Moonika Siimets and based on the novels Seltsimees laps ja suured inimesed ('The Little Comrade') and Samet ja saepuru ehk Seltsimees laps ja kirjatähed ('Velvet and Sawdust') by Leelo Tungal.

The film depicts the era of Stalinist tyranny in Estonia. The film's protagonist is six-year old girl Leelo whose mother (school director) is sent to a Siberian prison camp. Mother's last words are that if Leelo is a good girl, then mother will be soon back. Leelo is trying to do her best to fulfill mother's request.

Cast
Tambet Tuisk as Feliks
Helena Maria Reisner as Leelo
Yuliya Aug	as Ljudmilla
Juhan Ulfsak as Paul Varik
Maria Avdjuško as Makajeva
Argo Aadli	as Rider Jaan
Indrek Taalmaa	as Uncle Artur
Maarja Jakobson as Aunt Liilia
Aarne Soro as Uncle Ott
Kadri Rämmeld as Aunt Iida
Tarmo Song	as Uncle Mart
Liina Vahtrik as Aunt Anne
Maria Klenskaja as Grandmother	
Lembit Peterson as Grandfather 
Anna Sergejeva as Galina
Hilje Murel as Hairdresser Olja
Carmen Mikiver as Hairdresser Carmen
Sandra Uusberg as Hairdresser Sandra
Pille Pürg as Officer's Wife
Aleksander Okunev as Russian Officer
Liisa Pulk as Teacher Seeneke
Luule Komissarov as Ticket officer in the bus Tiiu
Sten Karpov as Soldier Dima
Juri Zilin as Chekist Valeri
Ene Järvis as Blonde Lady
Anne Reemann as voice
Eva Klemets as	Helmes
Klaus Peeter Rüütli as	Pedestrian
Taavo Vellend as Man in Town Hall square

References

External links
 
 Little Comrade (Estonian film), entry in Estonian Film Database (EFIS)
 Milena Spigaglia, “Seltsimees Laps” – not only a movie about Stalinist tyranny, but also on Estonian modesty, Estonian World

2018 films
Estonian drama films
Estonian-language films